Artur Udrys (born ) is a Belarusian professional volleyball player of Latvian descent.

Honours

Clubs
 National championships
 2009/2010  Belarusian Cup, with Stroitel Minsk
 2009/2010  Belarusian Championship, with Stroitel Minsk
 2010/2011  Belarusian Cup, with Stroitel Minsk
 2010/2011  Belarusian Championship, with Stroitel Minsk
 2011/2012  Belarusian Championship, with Stroitel Minsk
 2012/2013  Belarusian Cup, with Stroitel Minsk
 2012/2013  Belarusian Championship, with Stroitel Minsk

References

External links

 
 Player profile at PlusLiga.pl 
 Player profile at Volleybox.net 

1990 births
Living people
Sportspeople from Riga
Belarusian men's volleyball players
Belarusian expatriate sportspeople in Poland
Expatriate volleyball players in Poland
Belarusian expatriate sportspeople in Russia
Expatriate volleyball players in Russia
Belarusian expatriate sportspeople in South Korea
Expatriate volleyball players in South Korea
Belarusian expatriate sportspeople in China
Expatriate volleyball players in China
Belarusian expatriate sportspeople in France
Expatriate volleyball players in France
Belarusian expatriate sportspeople in Greece
Expatriate volleyball players in Greece
AZS Częstochowa players
Gumi KB Insurance Stars players
Projekt Warsaw players
PAOK V.C. players
Middle blockers
Opposite hitters